Vasek Pospisil was the defending champion but chose to compete at the 2013 Claro Open Colombia.

Frank Dancevic defeated first seed Lukáš Lacko 6–4, 6–7(4–7), 6–3 in the final.

Seeds

Draw

Finals

Top half

Bottom half

References
 Main Draw
 Qualifying Draw

Challenger Banque Nationale de Granby
Challenger de Granby